Lieutenant General Karl Gustav "Gugge" Åkerman (20October 1901 – 24May 1988) was a Swedish Army officer. Åkerman's senior commands include Chief of the Army Staff and the General Staff Corps from 1957 to 1961 and military commander of the IV Military District as well as Commandant General in Stockholm from 1961 to 1967.

Early life
Åkerman was born on 20 October 1901 in Stockholm, Sweden, the son of lieutenant general Joakim (Jockum) Åkerman and his wife Martina (née Björnstjerna). He was the brother of Oscar (Ocke) Åkerman and Richard (Riri) Åkerman.

Career
Åkerman was commissioned as an officer in the Göta Life Guards (I 2) in 1923 with the rank of second lieutenant. He became captain of the General Staff in 1936. Åkerman served as teacher at the Royal Swedish Army Staff College from 1938 to 1941 and served in the Älvsborg Regiment (I 15) in 1941.

He became major in the General Staff Corps in 1942 and was chief of staff of the V Military District from 1942 to 1944 and was back teaching at the Royal Swedish Army Staff College from 1944 to 1947. Åkerman was promoted to lieutenant colonel in 1945 and served in the Svea Life Guards (I 1) in 1947. He was promoted to colonel in 1950 and was regimental commander of Älvsborg Regiment (I 15) from 1951 to 1956. Åkerman served as Inspector of the Swedish Armoured Troops from 1956 to 1957 and was promoted to major general in 1957 and was appointed Chief of the Army Staff and the General Staff Corps. He stayed in that position until 1961.

Åkerman was military commander of IV Military District from 1961 to 1967 (Eastern Military District (Milo Ö) 1966–67) and served at the same time as the Commandant General in Stockholm. In 1966 he was promoted to lieutenant general. Åkerman served as chief of the His Majesty's Military Staff from 1969 to 1973.

Other work
Åkerman was military contributor in the Social-Demokraten newspaper from 1940 to 1942 and Borås Tidning from 1942 to 1945. He was chairman of the association Friends of the Army Museum (Armémusei vänner) from 1960 to 1976 and Swedish Military Sports Association (Sveriges militära idrottsförbund) from 1958 to 1967. Åkerman became a member of the Royal Swedish Academy of War Sciences in 1948.

Personal life
In 1925, he married Clary Magnusson (1904–1973), the daughter of managing director Karl Magnusson and Gerda (née Hasselgren). He was the father of Gerd (born 1927) and Lars (born 1932).

Death
Åkerman died on 24 May 1988 and was buried on 20 October 1988 in Norra begravningsplatsen in Stockholm.

Dates of rank
1923 – Second lieutenant
19?? – Lieutenant
1936 – Captain
1942 – Major
1945 – Lieutenant colonel
1950 – Colonel
1957 – Major general
1966 – Lieutenant general

Awards and decorations

Swedish
   Commander Grand Cross of the Order of the Sword (6 June 1964)
  Knight of the Order of the Polar Star
  Knight of the Order of Vasa

Foreign
   1st Class / Knight Grand Cross of the Order of Merit of the Italian Republic (14 June 1966)
   Commander with Star of the Order of St. Olav (1 July 1961)

References

1901 births
1988 deaths
Swedish Army lieutenant generals
Military personnel from Stockholm
Burials at Norra begravningsplatsen
Members of the Royal Swedish Academy of War Sciences
Commanders Grand Cross of the Order of the Sword
Knights of the Order of the Polar Star
Knights of the Order of Vasa